YAB or yab may refer to:

 Arctic Bay Airport
 Yamaguchi Asahi Broadcasting, A television station in Yamaguchi Prefecture, Japan
 Yann Arthus-Bertrand (b. 1946), a French photographer